The John Addison Porter Prize is a literary award given annually by Yale University to the best work of scholarship in any field "where it is possible, through original effort, to gather and relate facts or principles, or both, and to present the results in such a literary form as to make the product of general human interest."  This award is among the highest the university confers.  The prize was established in 1872 in honor of Professor John Addison Porter, B.A. 1842., and perpetuated with a subsequent gift in 1901.

The award should not be confused with the prize named for his son, the John Addison Porter Prize in American History, which is restricted to undergraduate history majors at Yale.

Winners
Winners of the John Addison Porter Prize over the years have included:

References

External links
John Addison Porter Prize, official website.
John Addison Porter Prize, prize description.

Awards and prizes of Yale University
Awards established in 1872
Awards for scholarly publications